Utricularia quinquedentata is an annual, terrestrial carnivorous plant that belongs to the genus Utricularia (family Lentibulariaceae). Its distribution ranges across northern Australia from Western Australia to northern Queensland and south to Brisbane. It was first identified by Ferdinand von Mueller as possibly a new species or variety in the early 1890s, noting it as "U. albiflora or a closely allied species." Mueller labeled one herbarium sheet as Utricularia albiflora var. quinquedentata. Without a valid description, according to the rules of botanical nomenclature, however, the epithet quinquedentata was not recognized until Peter Taylor validly published the species in 1986.

See also 
 List of Utricularia species

References 

Carnivorous plants of Australia
Flora of Queensland
Flora of the Northern Territory
Eudicots of Western Australia
Plants described in 1986
quinquedentata
Lamiales of Australia